Furnace is a village near the town of Llanelli in the county of Carmarthenshire, Wales. Furnace is named after the furnace built by Alexander Raby before the village was established. The main furnace remains but is neglected and in ruin.

Before the name 'Ffwrnes' or 'Furnace' was evident, the small hamlet was called 'Cwmddyche' which consisted of a few farmsteads and Bryn-y-môr house, which is Stradey Park hotel today. The village is at the mouth of a valley in which the Afon Cille flows. Llyn Trebeddrod or Furnace Pond is also within the village boundaries, and was constructed as a reservoir to serve the furnaces.

It is under the authority of Carmarthenshire County Council and Llanelli Rural Council.

References

Llanelli Rural
Villages in Carmarthenshire